Halopyrum is a genus of Asian and African plants in the grass family. The only known species is Halopyrum mucronatum, native to the Indian Subcontinent, Iran, the Arabian Peninsula, Socotra, Madagascar, and eastern + northeastern Africa (from Egypt to Mozambique).

References

Chloridoideae
Flora of Africa
Monotypic Poaceae genera
Flora of Asia